The Mumbles lifeboat disaster occurred in 1947 off south Wales when the Mumbles lifeboat was undertaking a rescue off Sker Point but was overwhelmed by the sea with the loss of all eight lives in the lifeboat.

History
Mumbles Lifeboat station is situated at the western end of Swansea Bay in the village of Mumbles. At the time of the disaster the Lifeboat operating there was RNLB Edward, Prince of Wales (ON 678).

On 23 April 1947 the  en route from Middlesbrough to Newport decided to stop at Sker Point on the Glamorgan coast not far from Porthcawl. Its three anchor cables were unable to hold the ship in the gale raging at the time and the ship foundered on the rocks, breaking into three.

The Mumbles lifeboat, in attempting a rescue, was believed to have been overwhelmed by a freak wave and all the crew were drowned. Memorials to the crew stand in the churchyard of All Saints' Church, Oystermouth.

A memorial service was held in Swansea attended by the Duke of Kent on the 50th anniversary of the disaster.

References

Maritime incidents in Wales
April 1947 events in the United Kingdom
1947 in Wales
History of Swansea
Swansea Bay
Disasters in Wales
Maritime incidents in 1947
1947 disasters in the United Kingdom